Luke Katene (born 4 June 1986) is a New Zealand rugby union player. He plays in the lock position for provincial side Canterbury and for New Zealand's Māori international side the Māori All Blacks. Katene has previously played for Bay of Plenty in 2010 before heading to Canterbury ahead of 2011 season's ITM Cup.

References

External links
 itsrugby.co.uk profile
 Luke Katene at AllBlacks.com

Living people
New Zealand rugby union players
1986 births
Bay of Plenty rugby union players
Canterbury rugby union players
Waikato rugby union players
Rugby union locks
Māori All Blacks players
People educated at the Church College of New Zealand
Rugby union players from Helensville